The 7th constituency of the Var (French: Septième circonscription du Var) is a French legislative constituency in the Var département. Like the other 576 French constituencies, it elects one MP using the two-round system, with a run-off if no candidate receives over 50% of the vote in the first round.

Description

The 7th constituency of the Var lies in the south west of the department and includes the town La Seyne-sur-Mer opposite Toulon's harbour.

In common with other seats in the department this constituency had a tradition of voting for centre right candidates until 2017 when it swung behind Emmanuel Macron's centrist coalition.

Assembly Members

Election results

2022

 
 
 
|-
| colspan="8" bgcolor="#E9E9E9"|
|-
 
 

 
 
 
 
 * PS dissident, not supported by NUPES alliance.

2017

 
 
 
 
 
 
 
|-
| colspan="8" bgcolor="#E9E9E9"|
|-

2012

 
 
 
 
 
|-
| colspan="8" bgcolor="#E9E9E9"|
|-

2007

 
 
 
 
 
 
 
 
|-
| colspan="8" bgcolor="#E9E9E9"|
|-

2002

 
 
 
 
 
|-
| colspan="8" bgcolor="#E9E9E9"|
|-

1997

 
 
 
 
 
 
|-
| colspan="8" bgcolor="#E9E9E9"|
|-

References

7